Tímea Babos and Andrea Sestini Hlaváčková were the defending champions,  but Babos chose not to participate and Sestini Hlaváčková chose to compete in Prague instead.

Anna Blinkova and Raluca Olaru won the title, defeating Georgina García Pérez and Fanny Stollár in the final, 6–4, 6–4.

Seeds

Draw

Draw

References

External Links
 Main Draw

Grand Prix SAR La Princesse Lalla Meryem - Doubles
2018 Doubles
2018 in Moroccan tennis